The Incredible Journey franchise (also referred to as the Homeward Bound series), consists of American adventure family-comedy installments, based on the 1961 novel of the same name by Sheila Burnford. The plot centers around unlikely trios of pets, who must work together as teams to find their way back through hundreds of miles to their respective homes. Each film uses a combination of voice acting with animal actors to portray for triple leads and emote their thoughts and spirit, alongside the actors for their family of owners.

The franchise includes the 1963 critically esteemed original feature film adaptation of the novel, as well as the 1993 remake and its respective 1996 sequel. The remake was similarly a box office success and met with positive reception with critics, and its sequel was met with mixed reviews.

Origin 

The 1961 British adventure children's novel by Scottish author Sheila Burnford, served as the inspiration for The Walt Disney Company's Homeward Bound film series. The story follows three pets: a young Labrador Retriever named Luath, an old English Bull Terrier named Champion Boroughcastle Brigadier of Doune (nicknamed "Bodger" for short), and a loyal Siamese cat name Tao. Together the animals brave over 300 miles through the Northwestern Ontario Canadian wilderness, searching for their masters. The events along the way portray the stress and suffering they experience along the way, as well as the loyalty and love the animals have for their owners.

Burnford has stated that though the novel is associated with children's literature, she did not write it with this intention. The author was inspired to write the story, based on the three family pets that she and her husband had while living in Canada; which each had a remarkably close relationship with each other. Following The Walt Disney Company 1963 adaptation, the studio developed a film franchise, with a reboot and its sequel.

Film

The Incredible Journey (1963)

Professor James Hunter is the proud owner of an aging English Bull Terrior named Bodger. His children Peter and Elizabeth are the owners of a young and rambunctious Labrador Retriever named Luath and a Siamese Cat named Tao, respectively. While the Hunter family is away, they take their pets across the country to their close friend named John Longridge. Under his care, the trio of pets begin to miss their owners. When John goes for a camping trip, leaving the animals in the care of his maid, the pets' loneliness overwhelms them. The three animals decide to find their way home, braving dangers and the 250 miles between. Along the way, the trio work together to overcome hunger, wild animals, and avoid the risks of natural wildlife. Despite the long journey, the trio work together to achieve their goal and return to their owners.

Homeward Bound: The Incredible Journey (1993)

A trio of animals - a young and adventurous American Bulldog named Chance, a wise and aged Golden Retriever named Shadow, and a reserved Chocolate Point Himalayan Cat named Sassy - are the beloved pets of the Seaver family. When the Seavers prepare to leave for a family vacation to San Francisco, California, they leave their three beloved pets at a family friend's ranch. As the animals grow restless, they begin to suspect that they have been abandoned and left for good. Together they decide to risk their lives, working together to brave the dangerous and exciting journey through the California wilderness to find their way home.

Homeward Bound II: Lost in San Francisco (1996)

When the Seaver family plans a family trip to Canada, they decide that this time they're bringing their three beloved pets with them. As they arrive at the San Francisco International Airport, and begin checking in their bags as well as their animals, the pets begin to panic thinking that they are being taken to the pound. As a group they break out of their carrier kennels, and rush out into the town. Together Chance, Shadow, and Sassy brave the big city which is home to various stray animals, all while avoiding the local dogcatchers. As they make new friends, the trio decides that they're not fit for vagrant lifestyle and work to once again find their owners and return home.

Main cast and characters

Additional crew and production details

Reception

Box office and financial performance

Critical and public response

Notes

References 

American film series